Kim Myong-gil (born 16 October 1984) is a North Korean international football player. He plays for Amrokgang in the DPR Korea League.

He has played on ten occasions for the North Korean national team, and has been called up to their 23-man squad for the 2010 FIFA World Cup.

External links

Kim Myong-Gil career stats at Soccerbase
Kim Myong-gil at DPRKFootball

1984 births
Living people
North Korean footballers
Association football goalkeepers
North Korea international footballers
2010 FIFA World Cup players
2011 AFC Asian Cup players
Amnokgang Sports Club players
Footballers at the 2006 Asian Games
Asian Games competitors for North Korea